The New Adelphi Club is a popular local venue for alternative live music in the city of Hull, East Riding of Yorkshire, England.  It has achieved notability outside its local area, having hosted such bands as The Stone Roses, Radiohead, Green Day and Oasis, in its over-30 year history. The club opened in October 1984, and Kaiser Chiefs performed there as part of the 30th anniversary celebrations in 2014.

History
In late 1984 the venue, which was formerly a terraced house that narrowly escaped a Luftwaffe bomb during the Blitz on Hull, and later had a spell as a working men's club, became The New Adelphi Club. Part of a Victorian residential street built in 1888 in the west of Hull, and named after the Earl de Grey and Ripon, 89 De Grey Street survived whilst the bomb scored a direct hit on a couple of adjacent properties.  To this day the bomb site serves as a small car park next to the club.

The club, whose owner Paul Jackson built on small beginnings, has hosted an eclectic range of national and international acts. The small intimate venue has remained shabby chic, ramshackle and idiosyncratic, but has retained a unique atmosphere as the colours of the interior walls changed from green to brown and back to green again. The venue contains a front room containing a pool table, and the bar area which is featured in CAMRA's 2015 version of the Good Beer Guide. This area remains open in the evening from 8 pm, irrespective of whether there is any live entertainment taking place. Otherwise the main concert room has hosted thousands of musicians over the years including those just commencing their careers such as Pulp, Green Day and Radiohead; plus local boys The Housemartins who first appeared there in 1988. Others appearing included The Stone Roses, Supergrass and Mumford & Sons. Oasis played at the Adelphi the day before the release of their first single, whilst Radiohead played there twice.  Their second appearance was in 1992 around the time of their hit single, "Creep". Uniquely, The Shamen once slept overnight on the venue's kitchen floor, after concluding their late evening's performance.

In 2009, a series of gigs were held, coupled with an exhibition and live performance at the Ferens Art Gallery, to celebrate the New Adelphi's silver anniversary.

In October 2014, the Kaiser Chiefs played at the New Adelphi as headline act for the venue's 30th anniversary celebration. A film capturing Kaiser Chiefs performance was made, which was shown at the Adelphi in January 2015 as part of Independent Music Venue Week. In October 2015, the film was screened at the 2015 Tucson Film & Music Festival in Arizona, United States.

Shortly afterwards, Paul Heaton and Richard Hawley both followed Kaiser Chiefs by playing at the Adelphi. In December 2015, The Bohicas performed at the venue.

In January 2016, BBC Radio 6 Music's Steve Lamacq broadcast from the studios at BBC Radio Humberside, as part of BBC Radio's Independent Music Venue Week tour. One night of the nationwide tour was hosted at the New Adelphi on 26 January 2016, with Mark Morriss as the headline act. Lach is due to perform at the venue in March 2016.

Performances

Alphabetical list of notable musicians who have performed at the Adelphi over the years:

Bert Jansch
Dodgy
Edgar Broughton
Fonda 500
First Aid Kit
Franz Ferdinand
Green Day
Happy Mondays
Inspiral Carpets
It's a Beautiful Day
Julie Felix
Kaiser Chiefs 
Levellers
Manic Street Preachers
Mark Morriss
Michael Chapman
Mike Heron
Mumford & Sons
My Bloody Valentine
Oasis
Townes Van Zandt
Paper Aeroplanes
Paul Heaton
Pavement
Primal Scream
Pulp
Radiohead
Red Guitars
Richard Hawley
Supergrass
The Bar-Steward Sons of Val Doonican 
The Bluetones
The Bohicas
The Housemartins
The La's
The Nightingales
Thurston Moore

References

External links
Official website
Timetable of forthcoming events

Music venues in the East Riding of Yorkshire
Music in Kingston upon Hull
Music venues completed in 1984
Buildings and structures in Kingston upon Hull
Culture in Kingston upon Hull
Tourist attractions in Kingston upon Hull
1984 establishments in England